Lalit Vijay Kolhe is an Indian politician, who is currently serving as the Mayor of Jalgaon. He is affiliated with Bharatiya Janata Party since July 2018. He was formerly associated with Maharashtra Navnirman Sena.

He was elected as the Mayor of Jalgaon in September 2017, succeeded by Nitin Ladda. Before his appointment to Mayor of Jalgaon Municipal Corporation, he was serving as the Jalgaon's deputy mayor, with support of MNS and Khandesh Vikas Aghadi, a party led by former Maharashtra Minister Suresh Jain.

He unsuccessfully contested the 2009 and 2014 legislative assembly election from Jalgaon (Assembly constituency) on the ticket of MNS.

Kolhe served as a corporator to the Jalgaon Municipal Corporation for Ward No.17-B from 1996 to 2016.

He also served as the Nagpur district president of Maharashtra Navnirman Sena and he resigned from his post in November 2014.

Positions held

References 

Living people
1975 births
Bharatiya Janata Party politicians from Maharashtra
Maharashtra Navnirman Sena politicians
20th-century Indian politicians
21st-century Indian politicians